The Conference of Protestant Churches in Latin Countries of Europe is a Christian ecumenical organization founded in 1950. It is a member of the World Council of Churches. Its members belong to Protestant churches in Belgium, France, Italy, Portugal, Spain, and Switzerland.

See also 
 Protestantism in Belgium
 Protestantism in France
 Protestantism in Italy
 Protestantism in Portugal
 Protestantism in Spain
 Protestantism in Switzerland

External links 
Official website
World Council of Churches listing

Protestantism in Europe
Protestant ecumenism
Denominational alliances
Members of the World Council of Churches
Regional councils of churches
Christian organizations established in 1950
Protestantism in Belgium
Protestantism in France
Protestantism in Italy
Protestantism in Portugal
Protestantism in Spain
Protestantism in Switzerland